Tio år med Agnetha (Ten Years With Agnetha) is a 1979 compilation album by Swedish pop singer Agnetha Fältskog, one of the members of ABBA. The album, released when ABBA's international career was at its peak, features the most successful Swedish solo recordings Fältskog made before and during her career with the band and it was her last album on the CBS-Cupol label.

Background 
The album, released in October 1979, included one new recording, "När du tar mej i din famn" (When You Take Me in Your Arms), composed and produced by Fältskog herself in the Polar Studios and with the same musicians and sound engineers (Michael B. Tretow) as on contemporary ABBA recordings. The lyrics were written by Ingela "Pling" Forsman who since has become one of Sweden's most prolific and successful lyricists, with some twenty-five entries taking part in the Melodifestivalen, several of which have also competed in the Eurovision Song Contest. "När du tar mig i din famn" topped the Swedish radio chart Svensktoppen in late 1979 and was also released as a single, with Fältskog's very first hit "Jag var så kär" on the B-side. An English-language demo recording of the track, called "The Queen Of Hearts", was discovered in the CBS-Cupol archives in the late 1990s and was included on Fältskog's international greatest hits album That's Me (Polar Music/Universal Music) in 1998.

Tio År Med Agnetha contains three tracks from Fältskog's 1975 album Elva Kvinnor I Ett Hus, including her Swedish-language version of ABBA's worldwide hit "SOS", and was re-released in digitally remastered form by Sony BMG Music Entertainment in the mid 1990s.

"När du tar mej i din famn" was later covered by Swedish singer Lotta Engberg.

Track listing

Weekly charts

References

De första åren, booklet
Tio år med Agnetha, LP cover & sleeve

Agnetha Fältskog compilation albums
1979 compilation albums